Margaret Middleton may refer to:

Margaret Clitherow (1556–1586), née Middleton, English saint and martyr
Yvonne De Carlo (1922–2007), actress, real name Margaret Middleton